Baseball Alberta is the provincial governing body for baseball in Alberta.

Sunburst League

The Senior AAA competition is known as the Sunburst League.  This is the highest level of amateur baseball in Alberta. Teams as of the 2021 season are:

 Confederation Park Cubs (Edmonton)
 Red Deer Riggers
 St. Albert Tigers
 Sherwood Park Athletics

References

Baseball in Alberta
Baseball governing bodies in Canada
Sports governing bodies in Alberta
Sports organizations established in 1967
1967 establishments in Alberta